East Texas is a village in Lower Macungie Township in Lehigh County, Pennsylvania. It is part of the Lehigh Valley, which had a population of 861,899 and was the 68th most populous metropolitan area in the U.S. as of the 2020 census.

Little Lehigh Creek forms its natural southern boundary. While the village has its own box post office, with ZIP Code of 18046, surrounding areas use the Allentown ZIP Code of 18106 and the Macungie ZIP Code of 18062.

The community was named after the state of Texas. The community's name was prefixed with "East" to avoid repetition with another Texas in the state. Day-Timer, the global manufacturer of calendars and organizational products, maintains one of its four U.S. operational and production offices in East Texas.

Public education
East Texas is served by East Penn School District. Emmaus High School serves grades nine through twelve. Eyer Middle School and Lower Macungie Middle School, both located in Macungie, serve grades six through eight.

References

Unincorporated communities in Lehigh County, Pennsylvania
Unincorporated communities in Pennsylvania